This is a complete list of FIM World Superbike Champions, from  up to and including .

Riders' World Championship

By season

By rider
Riders in bold were entered in the 2022 World Championship.

By rider nationality
Riders in bold were entered in the 2022 World Championship.

By race wins

By manufacturer
This table shows the motorcycles ridden to secure the riders' championship. For the manufacturers' champions, see the section below.

Manufacturers' World Championship

By season

By manufacturer
Manufacturers in bold were entered in the 2022 World Championship.

By manufacturer nationality
Manufacturers in bold were entered in the 2022 World Championship.

References
 

World Superbike Champions
champions
Superbike